The Myth of Mental Illness: Foundations of a Theory of Personal Conduct is a 1961 book by the psychiatrist Thomas Szasz, in which the author criticizes psychiatry and argues against the concept of mental illness. It received much publicity, and has become a classic, well known as an argument that "mentally ill" is a label which psychiatrists have used against people "disabled by living" rather than truly having a disease.

Background
Szasz writes that he became interested in writing The Myth of Mental Illness in approximately 1950, when, having become established as a psychiatrist, he became convinced that the concept of mental illness was vague and unsatisfactory. He began work on the book in 1954, when he was relieved of the burdens of a full-time psychiatric practice by being called to active duty in the navy. Later in the 1950s, it was rejected by the first publisher to whom Szasz submitted the manuscript. Szasz next sent the manuscript to Paul Hoeber, director of the medical division of Harper & Brothers, who arranged for it to be published.

Summary

Szasz argues that it does not make sense to classify psychological problems as diseases or illnesses, and that speaking of "mental illness" involves a logical or conceptual error. In his view, the term "mental illness" is an inappropriate metaphor and there are no true illnesses of the mind. His position has been characterized as involving a rigid distinction between the physical and the mental.

The legitimacy of psychiatry is questioned by Szasz, who compares it to alchemy and astrology, and argues that it offends the values of autonomy and liberty. Szasz believes that the concept of mental illness is not only logically absurd but has harmful consequences: instead of treating cases of ethical or legal deviation as occasions when a person should be taught personal responsibility, attempts are made to "cure" the deviants, for example by giving them tranquilizers. Psychotherapy is regarded by Szasz as useful not to help people recover from illnesses, but to help them "learn about themselves, others, and life." Discussing Jean-Martin Charcot and hysteria, Szasz argues that hysteria is an emotional problem and that Charcot's patients were not really ill.

Reception
The Myth of Mental Illness received much publicity, quickly became a classic, and made Szasz a prominent figure. The book was reviewed in the American Journal of Psychiatry, Journal of Nervous and Mental Disease, Psychosomatic Medicine, Archives of General Psychiatry, Clinical Psychology Review, and Psychologies. Published at a vulnerable moment for psychiatry, when Freudian theorizing was just beginning to fall out of favor and the field was trying to become more medically oriented and empirically based, the book provided an intellectual foundation for mental patient advocates and anti-psychiatry activists. It became well known in the mental health professions and was favorably received by those skeptical of modern psychiatry, but placed Szasz in conflict with many doctors. Soon after The Myth of Mental Illness was published, the Commissioner of the New York State Department of Mental Hygiene demanded, in a letter citing the book, that Szasz be dismissed from his university position because he did not accept the concept of mental illness.

The philosopher Karl Popper, in a 1961 letter to Szasz, called the book admirable and fascinating, adding that, "It is a most important book, and it marks a real revolution." The psychiatrist David Cooper wrote that The Myth of Mental Illness, like the psychiatrist R. D. Laing's The Divided Self (1960), proved stimulating in the development of anti-psychiatry, though he noted that neither book is itself an anti-psychiatric work. He described Szasz's work as "a decisive, carefully documented demystification of psychiatric diagnostic labelling in general." Socialist author Peter Sedgwick, writing in 1982, commented that in The Myth of Mental Illness, Szasz expounded a "game-playing model of social interaction" which is "zestful and insightful" but "neither particularly uncommon nor particularly iconoclastic by the standards of recent social-psychological theorising." Sedgwick argued that many of Szasz's observations are valuable regardless of the validity of Szasz's rejection of the concept of mental illness, and could easily be accepted by psychotherapists. Although agreeing with Szasz that the assignation of mental illness could undermine individual responsibility, he noted that this did not constitute an objection to the concept itself.

The philosopher Michael Ruse called Szasz the most forceful proponent of the thesis that mental illness is a myth. However, while sympathetic to Szasz, he considered his case over-stated. Ruse criticized Szasz's arguments on several grounds, maintaining that while the concepts of disease and illness were originally applied only to the physiological realm, they can properly be extended to the mind, and there is no logical absurdity involved in doing so. Kenneth Lewes wrote that The Myth of Mental Illness is the most notable example of the "critique of the institutions of psychiatry and psychoanalysis" that occurred as part of the "general upheaval of values in the 1960s", though he saw the work as less profound than Michel Foucault's Madness and Civilization (1961).

The psychiatrist Peter Breggin called The Myth of Mental Illness a seminal work. The author Richard Webster described the book as a well known argument against the tendency of psychiatrists to label people who are "disabled by living" as mentally ill. He observed that while some of Szasz's arguments are similar to his, he disagreed with Szasz's view that hysteria was an emotional problem and that Charcot's patients were not genuinely mentally ill. The lawyer Linda Hirshman wrote that while few psychiatrists adopted the views Szasz expounded in The Myth of Mental Illness, the book helped to encourage a revision of their diagnostic and therapeutic claims. The historian Lillian Faderman called the book the most notable attack on psychiatry published in the 1960s, adding that "Szasz's insights and critiques would prove invaluable to the homophile movement."

See also
 Game theory — for Szasz, mental illness is best understood through the lens of game theory
 Neurodiversity — A belief of promoting the acceptance of numerous different brain types typically considered to be mental disorders or illnesses by the scientific community

References

External links
 Text of the original paper The Myth of Mental Illness

1961 non-fiction books
American non-fiction books
Anti-psychiatry books
Books by Thomas Szasz
English-language books
Harper & Row books